Baltachevsky District (Baltas rayonı; , Baltaç rayonı) is an administrative and municipal district (raion), one of the fifty-four in the Republic of Bashkortostan, Russia. It is located in the north of the republic and borders with Tatyshlinsky District in the north, Askinsky and Karaidelsky Districts in the east, Mishkinsky District in the south, and with Burayevsky District in the west. Its administrative center is the rural locality (a selo) of Starobaltachevo. As of the 2010 Census, the total population of the district was 21,623, with the population of Starobaltachevo accounting for 25.9% of that number.

History
The district was established in 1930.

Administrative and municipal status
Within the framework of administrative divisions, Baltachevsky District is one of the fifty-four in the Republic of Bashkortostan. The district is divided into fifteen selsoviets, comprising seventy-nine rural localities. As a municipal division, the district is incorporated as Baltachevsky Municipal District. Its fifteen selsoviets are incorporated as fifteen rural settlements within the municipal district. The selo of Starobaltachevo serves as the administrative center of both the administrative and municipal district.

References

Notes

Sources

Districts of Bashkortostan
States and territories established in 1930